The Petitions Committee is a parliamentary committee of the House of Commons of the United Kingdom. Its role is to oversee petitions submitted to Parliament, including both electronically through the UK Parliament petitions website, and traditional paper petitions. The Committee is one of the youngest in the Commons, formed in 2015, and is made up of 11 backbench Members of Parliament.

Procedure
The process for e-petitions differs from the process for paper petitions, which can only be presented to the House of Commons by an MP.

E-petitions can be submitted  by British citizens and UK residents to the UK Government and Parliament via the UK Parliament petitions website. Petitions must be about something which Government or Parliament is responsible for, and must ask for a specific action from Parliament or Government.

An e-petition must be signed by the petition creator and five supporters before it will be sent for moderation. Moderation ensures that draft petitions meet the website's standards for publication. Petitions which do not meet the website's standards are rejected. Petitions published on the website are available for members of the public to sign. Petitions remain open for signatures for six months.  At the end of six months, petitions are closed and formally reported by the Petitions Committee to Parliament.

All petitions which are published are reviewed by the Petitions Committee. Petitions which reach 10,000 signatures receive a written response from the UK Government. The Committee can schedule debates in the House of Commons' second debating chamber (Westminster Hall), on Monday evenings at 4.30 pm.

When Parliament is dissolved, all open petitions on petition.parliament.uk are closed, and new petitions are not accepted. After a new Petitions Committee is set up by the House of Commons, closed petitions are not reopened.

Petitions which reach 100,000 signatures are considered by the Committee for debate. Petitions may not be put forward for debate if the issue has been debated recently, or is already scheduled for debate in the near future. Most petitions which reach the threshold are debated.

The Petitions Committee may also take other action on published petitions. On 1 March 2016 the Committee published its first report, Funding for research into brain tumours, in response to a petition which had gained over 120,000 signatures.

The Petitions Committee has also taken oral evidence jointly with the Environment, Food and Rural Affairs Committee on grouse shooting, with the Health Select Committee on the meningitis B vaccine, and with the Women and Equalities Committee on high heels and workplace dress codes in response to petitions.

Membership
As of June 2022, the members of the committee are as follows:

Petitions debated by the Commons

2015-2017 Parliament

References

External links
 Petitions Committee

Select Committees of the British House of Commons